Green Grow the Rushes is a 1949 comedy novel by the British writer Howard Clewes. The title refers to the traditional folk song "Green Grow the Rushes, O". It revolves around a group of officials from a Whitehall government department who travel to the Kent coast for an investigation, only to find themselves encountering a community entirely committed to smuggling.

It was adapted into a 1951 British film of the same title directed by Derek N. Twist and starring Roger Livesey, Honor Blackman and Richard Burton.

References

Bibliography
 Goble, Alan. The Complete Index to Literary Sources in Film. Walter de Gruyter, 1999.

1949 British novels
British comedy novels
British novels adapted into films
The Bodley Head books
Novels set in Kent